Bosea thiooxidans is a gram-negative species of bacteria that oxidises thiosulfate, the type species of its genus. Its type strain is BI-42.

References

Further reading

External links

LPSN
Type strain of Bosea thiooxidans at BacDive -  the Bacterial Diversity Metadatabase

Hyphomicrobiales
Bacteria described in 1996